is a Kitakyūshū Monorail station in Kokurakita-ku, Kitakyūshū, Japan. It shouldn't be confused with the Jōno Station of JR Kyushu, located about 500m eastward.

History
The station opened on 9 January 1985.

Station layout
The elevated station has two side platforms with two tracks.

Platforms

References

Railway stations in Japan opened in 1985